Transcription factors are proteins that bind genomic regulatory sites. Identification of genomic regulatory elements is essential for understanding the dynamics of developmental, physiological and pathological processes. Recent advances in chromatin immunoprecipitation followed by sequencing (ChIP-seq) have provided powerful ways to identify genome-wide profiling of DNA-binding proteins and histone modifications. The application of ChIP-seq methods has reliably discovered transcription factor binding sites and histone modification sites.

Transcription factor binding site databases

Comprehensive List of transcription factor binding sites (TFBSs) databases based on ChIP-seq data as follows:

References 

Bioinformatics
Genetics databases